Jan-Ole Gerster (born 1978 in Hagen) is a German film director and screenwriter.

Life 
Gerster works as a film director and screenwriter in Germany.

He was a TorinoFilmLab AdaptLab participant in 2016.

Filmography 
 2004: Der Schmerz geht, der Film bleibt (documentary film, director)
 2006: A Friend of Mine (actor)
 2012: A Coffee In Berlin (director and screenwriter)
 2019: Lara (director)

Awards 
 2013: Deutscher Filmpreis
 2013: Romy
 2013: New Faces Award
 2019: Karlovy Vary International Film Festival
 2019: Les Arcs European Film Festival
 2019: Filmfest München

External links

References 

 Blankenship, Robert and Jill E. Twark. "'Berliner Sonderschule': History, Space, and Humour in Jan Ole Gerster's Oh Boy (A Coffee in Berlin). Seminar: A Journal of Germanic Studies. 53.4 (November 2017): 362–381.

Film people from North Rhine-Westphalia
1978 births
Living people
People from Hagen
European Film Awards winners (people)
Best Director German Film Award winners